Toneel (Dutch word for: "theatre") is a genre of theatrical drama performance developed in early 20th-century Dutch East Indies (modern-day Indonesia). Compared to earlier native musical dramas, such as the Malay bangsawan and Komedie Stamboel, toneel adapted more European stylings, with an emphasis on spoken dialogue and a reduction in the amount of music used during the performance; thus the genre is called toneel, an adaptation of the Dutch word for theatre.

One of the notable toneel troupe is Dardanella that gain popularity in East Indies back in 1920s. The play is presented in Malay and often featured themes and adaptations derived from popular Hollywood productions for the stage, including The Mark of Zorro, The Three Musketeers and The Thief of Bagdad. The toneel drama later influenced the development of film industry in the Dutch East Indies, and also influenced native Indonesian musical dramatic forms such as sandiwara, lenong, and ludruk.

See also

Bangsawan
Komedie Stamboel

References

Bibliography

Indonesian culture
Theatre in Indonesia
Traditional drama and theatre of Indonesia
Dance in Indonesia